Catherine Davies or similar may refer to:

 Catherine Davies (governess) (1773–after 1841), Governess in Naples who sold her story in a book
 Catherine Glyn Davies (1926–2007), Welsh historian of philosophy and linguistics
 Katharine Davies (born 1968), British writer of romance novels
 Kathryn Davies, wife of Andrew Adonis, Baron Adonis

See also
 Katherine Davis (disambiguation)
 Davies